Ashley Mufandauya (born 15 December 2001) is a Zimbabwean cricketer. He made his first-class debut on 26 February 2020, for Mashonaland Eagles in the 2019–20 Logan Cup. In December 2020, he was selected to play for the Eagles in the 2020–21 Logan Cup. He made his List A debut on 18 April 2021, for Eagles, in the 2020–21 Pro50 Championship.

References

External links
 

2001 births
Living people
Zimbabwean cricketers
Mashonaland Eagles cricketers
Cricketers from Harare